Piera Verri (23 September 1913 – 19 July 2006) was an Italian female basketball player. She played at the center position.

International career
She represented Italian national basketball team at the EuroBasket 1938 in Rome where they won the gold medal, a first in the history of the Italian team.

Personal life
She was married to Guido Manzini, player and coach of the men's and women's team of the BC Reyer Venezia.

External links
Profile

1913 births
2006 deaths
Centers (basketball)
Italian women's basketball players
European champions for Italy
FIBA EuroBasket-winning players